Zameen Aasmaan may refer to:

 Zameen Aasmaan (1984 film), a 1984 Indian film directed by Bharat Rangachary
 Zameen Aasman a 1994 Pakistani film directed by Hasnain
 Zameen Aasmaan (1946 film), a 1946 Bollywood film
 Zameen Aasmaan (1972 film), a 1972 Hindi action film directed by A. Veerappan